Martin John Vickers (born 13 September 1950) is a British Conservative Party politician. He was elected as the Member of Parliament (MP) for Cleethorpes at the 2010 general election.

Early life
Born in Cleethorpes, Lincolnshire, Vickers was educated at Havelock School and Grimsby College. He gained a politics degree at the University of Lincoln after six years as a part-time student in 2004.

In 1979, he stood as a Conservative candidate for the Cromwell ward on Great Grimsby Borough Council, but was not successful. The following year, he elected as a councillor for the Weelsby ward on that council. Having only narrowly held his seat in 1986 by just 74 votes, he changed seats in 1990 to the Scartho ward (even then, only winning by an even narrower 30 votes) while Labour comfortably gained his old seat. In 1994, he lost his seat in Scartho to the Liberal Democrats.

In 1995, he stood for the Scartho ward (with boundaries similar to the former Humberside County Council division) on the then-newly created unitary authority North East Lincolnshire Council which replaced the Great Grimsby and Cleethorpes borough councils, but was unsuccessful. He did, however, gain the seat from Labour in 1999 and remained on the authority until 2011

Before being elected an MP, he served as full-time Conservative agent for Edward Leigh.

Parliamentary career
Vickers was elected to the House of Commons as Member of Parliament (MP) for Cleethorpes in the 2010 general election, by a majority of 4,298. On 24 October 2011, Vickers was one of 81 MPs to rebel against the government to vote for a national referendum on the European Union. He was re-elected in the 2015 election and 2017 election.

Political views and parliamentary voting record
Vickers opposes the legalisation of same-sex marriage. He voted against Marriage (Same Sex Couples) Act 2013 which introduced it in England and Wales. Vickers also voted against similar legislation which introduced it in Northern Ireland in 2019. In the same year, Vickers was one of 21 MPs who voted against LGBT inclusive sex and relationship education in English schools. He also voted against the legalisation of abortion in Northern Ireland in 2019.

Despite his social conservative views on gay rights and abortions, Vickers has maintained he opposes the reintroduction of the death penalty.

Vickers supported Brexit in the 2016 EU membership referendum. He voted for then Prime Minister Theresa May's withdrawal agreement.

He is a member of the Conservative Christian Fellowship. As of 31 July 2019, Vickers is the vice chair of the APPGs for Albania, Azerbaijan, Central America, Faroe Islands, Iceland, Isle of Man, East Coast Main Line, Economic Development, Fair Fuel for UK Motorists and UK Hauliers, Fisheries, Football, Rail in the North, Transport Across the North, and Yorkshire and Northern Lincolnshire. He is the secretary of the APPG for Australia and New Zealand and the treasurer for the APPG for Heritage Rail. He is also the chair of the APPG for Kosovo, North Macedonia, Freeports, Oil Refining Sector, Rail. Vickers is co-chair of the APPG for Montenegro and an officer for the APPG for Serbia and River Thames.

Following an interim report on the connections between colonialism and properties now in the care of the National Trust, including links with historic slavery, Vickers was among the signatories of a letter to The Telegraph in November 2020 from the "Common Sense Group" of Conservative Parliamentarians. The letter accused the National Trust of being "coloured by cultural Marxist dogma, colloquially known as the 'woke agenda'".

Personal life
He is married to Ann, and they have one daughter. His wife works in his parliamentary office as a part-time junior secretary.

References

External links

Martin Vickers MP Martin Vickers MP official constituency website
Martin Vickers MP Conservative Party profile
Cleethorpes Conservatives

1950 births
Living people
Conservative Party (UK) MPs for English constituencies
UK MPs 2010–2015
UK MPs 2015–2017
UK MPs 2017–2019
UK MPs 2019–present
People from Cleethorpes
Alumni of the University of Lincoln
Councillors in the Borough of North East Lincolnshire